The 2017 Vivo Pro Kabaddi League season was the fifth season of Pro Kabaddi League, a professional kabaddi league in India since 2014. It is organised by Mashal Sports and Star India. This season includes 12 teams after the inclusion of four new teams: UP Yoddha, Tamil Thalaivas, Haryana Steelers and Gujarat Fortunegiants.

Auction 
Auctions for the new season were held in May, before which the existing teams were allowed to retain one player each. The auction saw over 400 players go under the hammer and a total of Rs 46.99 crore spent by the 12 teams.

The most expensive pick of the auction was raider Nitin Tomar, who was bought by the new UP franchise for a sum of Rs 93 lakh. Following in second place was Rohit Kumar after the Bengaluru Bulls picked him for a Rs 81 lakh price. The most expensive foreign player was South Korea's Jang Kun Lee after he was retained by the Bengal Warriors for Rs 80.3 lakhs.

Opening ceremony 
The opening ceremony is held on the first match of every leg in each stadium. This is similar to that of IPL 2017. It is done so to highlight the importance of the tradition and culture all over the country.

Teams

Stadiums and locations

Personnel & kit

Sponsorship 
 Vivo
 TVS
 Bajaj
 Mutual Funds Sahi hai!
 Gillette Mach3 Turbo
 Nissin
 Royal Challenge Sports Drink
 RR Kabel

Rules and regulations 
The 12 teams are divided into two zones of six each. Each team plays a total of 22 matches in the league stage:

1. Teams from the same zone play each other thrice, totalling 15 matches in the zone.

2. Then, a team will play an additional of 6 matches with the teams from the other zone.
(Each team plays other team from the other zone once).
These 6 inter-zone matches for each team will  be held on three different weeks.
These weeks are known as inter-zone challenge weeks and the respective weeks are:
 1st: 15 August – 20 August
 2nd: 5 September – 10 September
 3rd: 26 September – 1 October

3. Then, each team plays one wild card match which is an additional inter-zone match in the penultimate week, selected by a random mid-season draw, totalling 22 matches in the league stage.

The top three teams from each zone qualify for the super playoffs and compete for the title.

Points Table

League stage 
Source:prokabaddi.com

Leg 1 – Gachibowli Indoor Stadium, Hyderabad

Leg 2 – Mankapur Indoor Stadium, Nagpur

Leg 3 – The Arena, Ahmedabad

Leg 4 – Babu Banarasi Das Indoor Stadium, Lucknow

Leg 5 – Dome@NSCI SVP Stadium, Mumbai

Leg 6 – Netaji Subhas Chandra Bose Stadium, Kolkata

Leg 7 – Motilal Nehru School of Sports, Sonepat

Leg 8 – Harivansh Tana Bhagat Indoor Stadium, Ranchi

Leg 9 – Thyagaraj Sports Complex, New Delhi

Leg 10 – Jawaharlal Nehru Indoor Stadium, Chennai

Leg 11 – Sawai Mansingh Indoor Stadium, Jaipur

Leg 12 – Shree Shiv Chhatrapati Sports Complex, Pune

Playoffs

Bracket

Eliminator 1 – Dome@NSCI SVP Stadium, Mumbai

Eliminator 2 – Dome@NSCI SVP Stadium, Mumbai

Qualifier 1 – Sardar Vallabhbhai Patel Indoor Stadium, Mumbai

Eliminator 3 – Dome@NSCI SVP Stadium, Mumbai

Qualifier 2 – Jawaharlal Nehru Indoor Stadium, Chennai

Final – Jawaharlal Nehru Indoor Stadium, Chennai

Statistics 

Source: prokabaddi.com

Most Points Overall

Most Raid Points

Most Tackle Points

Most Super 10s

Most High 5s

References 

Pro Kabaddi League seasons
2017 in Indian sport